Philip Parker may refer to:

 Sir Philip Parker, uncle of Anne Boleyn
 Philip Parker (of Erwarton) (died 1675) English politician MP for Suffolk
 Philip M. Parker (born 1960) professor of Management Science
The following were Parker baronets, of Arwaton (1661)
 Sir Philip Parker, 1st Baronet (–1690) English politician son of the above, MP for Harwich and Sandwich
 Sir Philip Parker, 2nd Baronet  (c. 1650–c. 1698) son of the above
 Sir Philip Parker-a-Morley-Long, 3rd Baronet (1682–1741) English politician son of the above, MP for Harwich